The Jinnah family was a political family of Pakistan. Jinnahs have played an important role in the Pakistan Movement for creation of Pakistan, a separate country for Muslims of India. The family held the leadership of All-India Muslim League, and its successor, Muslim League, until it dissolved in 1958 by martial law. Originally from a Gujarati Khoja background,  they moved to Karachi from Kathiawar, Bombay Presidency in the 19th century.

Jinnah's paternal grandfather was from Paneli Moti village in Gondal state in Kathiawar peninsula (now in Gujarat, India). Jinnah's family history is disputed among various sources. Jinnah was the eldest of seven children of Jinnahbhai Poonja, a prosperous merchant, and his wife, Mithibai. His family was a member of the Khoja caste, Hindus who had converted to Islam centuries earlier and who were followers of the Aga Khan. Although born to a Khoja (from Khwaja or 'noble') family who were disciples of the Aga Khan, Jinnah moved towards the Sunni sect early in life. There is evidence later, given by his relatives and associates in court, to establish that he was firmly a Sunni Muslim by the end of his life.

Muhammad Ali Jinnah (also referred to as only Jinnah) and Fatima Jinnah, have been important figures in the history of Pakistan. Jinnah is considered as the founder of Pakistan and he served as the first Governor General of Pakistan upon independence, while Fatima played an important role in the struggle for Pakistan Movement and was the founding mother of Pakistan. Jinnah and Fatima have remained extremely important and well-respected figures in Pakistan, even after their deaths. Several public places, universities, and hospitals in the world have been named after Jinnah and his sister Fatima, and the former's birth and death anniversary are among the public holidays in Pakistan.

Members of the Jinnah family
The ancestors of Jinnah were Khoja from Paneli Moti village in Gondal state in Kathiawar Bombay Presidency, British India Hindus who had converted to Islam centuries earlier.

First Generation 

 Poonja Meghji. He was the last generation to give his children Hindu names. He also observed most Hindu religious rituals: 
 Manbai
 Valji
 Nathoobhai
 Jinnahbhai

Second generation
Jinnahbhai Poonja. (also referred to as Jina Poonja), a Khoja (1857–1902), was married to Mithhibai.
 m. Mithhibai
 Jinnahbhai Poonja was a prosperous Gujarati merchant. He moved to Karachi before Muhammad Ali Jinnah's birth. He and his wife had 7 children to whom they stopped giving Hindu names, stopped observance of Hindu chatti ritual, and began giving Quran lessons to their children:
 Muhammad Ali Jinnah
 Ahmed Ali Jinnah
 Bunde Ali Jinnah
 Rahmat Bai Jinnah
 Shireen Bai Jinnah
 Fatima Jinnah
 Maryam Bai Jinnah

Third generation
 Muhammad Ali Jinnah (1876–1948)
 Jinnah is the founder of Pakistan and was the country's first Governor-General. His first marriage in 1892 was the result of his mother urging him to marry his cousin Emibai Jinnah before he left for England to pursue higher studies. However, Emibai died a few months later. His second marriage took place in 1918 to Rattanbai Petit (granddaughter of Dinshaw Maneckji Petit and Ratanji Dadabhoy Tata), a Parsi who was 24 years his junior. Rattanbai converted to Islam when she married Jinnah. In 1919, she gave birth to their only daughter, Dina Jinnah.
 m. Emibai Jinnah
 Dawn (newspaper) Fact File: "In his youth, Mohammad Ali Jinnah was married to a distant cousin named Emibai from Paneli village in Gujarat at his mother's urging. At the time of their marriage, Jinnah was only 16 and Emibai was 14. The marriage was arranged by his mother because she feared that when Jinnah went to England, he might end up marrying an English girl. The couple hardly lived together as Jinnah sailed from India soon after his marriage and Emibai died a few weeks later."
 m. Rattanbai Jinnah (1900-1929)
 Ahmed Ali Jinnah
 Bunde Ali Jinnah
 Rahmat Bai Jinnah
 Shireen Jinnah
 Fatima Jinnah (1893–1967)
 Fatima Jinnah was a dental surgeon, biographer, stateswoman, and one of the leading Founding mothers of modern-state of Pakistan. She also played a pivotal role in civil rights and introduced the women's rights movement in the Pakistan Movement. After her brother's death she continued to play a pivotal role in Pakistani politics and in 1965 returned to active politics by running against Ayub Khan in the 1965 elections.
 Maryam Bai Jinnah

Fourth generation
 Dina Wadia (1919–2017)
 Dina was born to Muhammad Ali Jinnah and Rattainbai Jinnah (née Petit) in London shortly after midnight on the morning of 15 August 1919. As Stanley Wolpert's Jinnah of Pakistan records: "Oddly enough, precisely twenty-eight years to the day and hour before the birth of Jinnah's other offspring, Pakistan."

She had a rift with her father when she expressed her desire to marry a Parsi-born Indian, Neville Wadia. According to M C Chagla in "Roses in December", Jinnah, a Muslim, disowned his daughter after trying to dissuade her from marrying Neville. Dina Wadia was the only direct living link to Jinnah and the nation of Pakistan claiming her father as its own father of the nation is assumed to have some kind of kinship with her according to Akbar S. Ahmed. His descendants through her are part of the Wadia family and reside in India as she married and stayed in India after the creation of Pakistan in 1947. Dina Wadia lived alone with staff in the New York City, United States. Wadia died of pneumonia at her home in New York on 1 November 2017 at the age of 98.

Estates

Private estates
 Wazir Mansion, Jinnah's birthplace in Karachi
 South Court, Muhammad Ali Jinnah's former residence in Mumbai, India, currently owned by the government of India.
 Muhammad Ali Jinnah House, Jinnah's former House at 10 Dr APJ Abdul Kalam Road, New Delhi, currently the Dutch Embassy in India.
 Quaid-e-Azam House, Muhammad Ali Jinnah's House in Karachi

Official residences
 Governor-General's House, Jinnah's official residence in Karachi
 Quaid-e-Azam Residency, Jinnah's residence in Balochistan where he spent the last days of his life

Family photos

Family tree

See also
 Wadia family
 Petit family

References

 
Family
Political families of Pakistan
Muslim families
First Families of Pakistan
Gujarati people
Muhajir families
Pakistani Shia Muslims
Indian Shia Muslims
Pakistani Sunni Muslims
Indian Sunni Muslims
Khoja Ismailism